The Kulfo River is a river in southern Ethiopia that rises in the western escarpment of the Main Ethiopian Rift in the Guge mountains.

It flows through Arba Minch and then through the Nechisar National Park on the isthmus between Lake Chamo and Lake Abaya. It usually drains into Lake Chamo but can also drain into Lake Abaya after heavy rains through a bifurcation located directly southwest of Arba Minch Airport.

The lower reaches of Kulfo River can act as the overflow channel (spillway) for Lake Abaya into Lake Chamo in case of high lake levels. The overflow point is directly below an alluvial fan at an elevation of 1,190 m (at ). The riverbed then discharges the excess lake water into Lake Chamo.

An important bridge over the river was restored in 2006. The river has dried out considerably in recent years.

Characteristics 
It is a braided river, with a catchment area of 300 km³. Near its mouth it is 20 meter wide, with a slope gradient of 10 metre per kilometre. The average diameter of the bed material is 14 mm (gravel).

Sediment transport 
The river transports carries annually 53,480 tonnes of bedload and 327,230 tonnes of suspended sediment to Lake Chamo.

Tropical insects 
Cytotaxonomic analysis of larval chromosomes from the Kulfo River area has revealed the existence of two newly recognized species of Black flies in the river, Simulium kulfoense and S. soderense; yet unlike other Black flies these species are not carriers of Onchocerca volvulus.

See also
List of Ethiopian rivers

References

Rivers of Ethiopia
Southern Nations, Nationalities, and Peoples' Region